The new state of Michigan elected its new senators in 1835, both Jacksonians: Lucius Lyon (Class 1) and John Norvell (Class 2).  They were not seated until January 26, 1837 due to a territorial dispute with Ohio. In the term beginning March 4, 1837, they would sit as Democrats.

See also 
 List of United States senators from Michigan
 1834 and 1835 United States Senate elections

1835
Michigan
United States Senate
Single-candidate elections